Émile Camut (1849-1905) was a French architect. Some of the buildings he designed, like the Hôtel Côte-Blatin in Clermont-Ferrand, are listed as official historic monuments. He also redesigned the spa in Le Mont-Dore, another listed building, in 1887. By 1895, he designed the Protestant Temple in Mont Dore. With architect Georges Vimort, he designed the Casino Chardon in La Bourboule.

References

1849 births
1905 deaths
19th-century French architects